Rangitaamo Tiahuia Takarangi  (née Taiuru, 24 July 1901 – 5 June 1992) was a notable New Zealand Māori welfare officer and community leader. Of Māori descent, she identified with the Ngati Hauiti and Ngāti Hine (Waikato) iwi. She was born in Waimoho, near Rangiriri, New Zealand, in 1901.

In the 1986 New Year Honours, Takarangi was awarded the Queen's Service Medal for community service.

References

1901 births
1992 deaths
Ngāti Hauiti people
People from Waikato
Recipients of the Queen's Service Medal